is a Japanese manga series written and illustrated by Lily Hoshino.  It was released in English by Digital Manga Publishing on March 15, 2006.

Reception
Julie Rosato viewed Hoshino's feminine uke designs as a flaw, and thought that each of the stories weren't given enough space to develop properly. Phil Guie was confused as to what the theme of the anthology was, but noted that most of the stories are lighthearted. Joanna Draper Carlson thought the main story of the volume ended too "abruptly", and also criticised the feminine uke designs.

References

Manga anthologies
2004 manga
Yaoi anime and manga
Digital Manga Publishing titles